WSFI (88.5 FM) is a radio station licensed to serve the community of Antioch, Illinois. The station is owned by BVM Helping Hands, and airs a Catholic radio format.

The station was assigned the WSFI call letters by the Federal Communications Commission on December 17, 2010.

References

External links
 Official Website
 

Radio stations established in 2014
2014 establishments in Illinois
SFI
Lake County, Illinois